Jorge Torres Obleas (born May 24, 1957, in La Paz) is a Bolivian politician and engineer. Holding master's degrees in Electrical Engineering and Economic Planning, Torres Obleas has worked as a consultant in various Latin American countries. He has also served as a lecturer at the Universidad Mayor de San Andrés in La Paz.

Torres Obleas was a member of parliament (Chamber of Deputies) between 1989 and 1993, and served as the president of the Commission on Environment and Natural Resources as well as presiding over the Commission on Economic Planning. Following his parliamentary tenure, he was coordinator in charge of formulating the National Governability Programme 1993–1994.

Torres Obleas was the director of the daily newspaper Hoy between 1994 and 1995. He has also been a columnist for newspapers such as La Razón, La Estrella del Oriente and El Deber.

He was re-elected to the Chamber of Deputies in 1997, through the proportional representation vote in La Paz as a Revolutionary Left Movement (MIR) candidate. His alternate was Beatríz Peinado de Solíz. As of 2002, he was a member of the Executive Committee of MIR and the president of the Potosí Foundation.

Torres Obleas served as Minister of Economic Development in the second cabinet of Gonzalo Sanchez de Lozada 2002–2003.

Torres Obleas left Bolivia in 2009, avoiding standing trial on accusation of involvement in the "Black October" killings (a military crackdown on protesters in 2003, in which more than 60 people died). He was granted asylum by the Peruvian government. The Bolivian government has asked Peru to extradite him.

References

1957 births
People from La Paz
Living people
Revolutionary Left Movement (Bolivia) politicians
Members of the Chamber of Deputies (Bolivia)